Presidential elections were held in Lithuania on 17 May 2009. A run-off would have been held on 7 June 2009, but was not necessary as Dalia Grybauskaitė was elected with 69 percent of the vote, with voter turnout just over the 50% threshold for the result to be validated. This is the largest margin of victory in a direct presidential election in Lithuania. Grybauskaitė took office on 12 July as the country's first female president.

This was only the second time since the restoration of independence that a Lithuanian president was elected without the need for a runoff, the first being in 1993, when Algirdas Brazauskas was elected with 61 percent in the first round.

Candidates
The Electoral Commission registered 14 candidates for the elections, whilst Vladimir Romanov's application was rejected. However, six candidates (Jonas Jankauskas, Vytautas Kundrotas, Algimantas Matulevičius, Algirdas Pilvelis, Vidmantas Sadauskas and Zigmas Vaišvila) failed to collect the 20,000 signatures required, and Seimas Speaker Arūnas Valinskas (National Resurrection Party) withdrew his candidacy.

Seven candidates collected enough signatures to participate in the elections:
Dalia Grybauskaitė, incumbent European Commissioner for Financial Programming and the Budget, former Minister of Finance (2001–2004)
Valentinas Mazuronis (Order and Justice), member of the Seimas since 2004
Kazimiera Prunskienė, first Prime Minister of Lithuania (1990–1991) and former Minister of Agriculture (2004–2008)
, Brigadier General of Lithuanian Armed Forces and wrestler
Valdemar Tomaševski (Electoral Action of Poles in Lithuania), member of the Seimas since 2000
Loreta Graužinienė (Labour Party), member of the Seimas since 2004
Algirdas Butkevičius (Social Democratic Party), former Minister of Finance (2004–2005) and former Minister of Transport and Communications (2006–2008)

Grybauskaitė was supported by the Homeland Union and Liberal Movement.

Opinion polls
According to the opinion polls, Grybauskaitė was the undisputed leader in the race for the Presidency.

Results

References

External links
2009 Lithuanian presidential elections VRK 

Lithuania
Presidential election
Presidential elections in Lithuania